Amanita calyptroderma also known as coccora, coccoli or the Pacific amanita, is a white-spored mushroom that fruits naturally in the coastal forests of the western United States during the fall and winter and spring.

Description
This mushroom's cap is about 10–25 cm in diameter, usually orange-brown in color (but sometimes white), and partially covered by a thick white patch of universal veil. It has white, close gills. Its cream-colored stalk is about 10–20 cm in length and 2–4 cm in width, adorned with a partial veil. It has a partially hollow stem (filled with a stringy white pith), and a large, sacklike volva at the base of the stalk.

The spores of this species, which are white, do not change color when placed in a solution of Melzer's reagent, and thus are termed inamyloid. This characteristic in combination with the skirt-like annulus and absence of a bulb at the base of the stalk place this mushroom in the section Caesareae.

Distribution and habitat
This mushroom occurs in conifer forests, forming mycorrhizae with madrone (Arbutus menziesii) in the southern part of its range (Central California northwards to Washington).  However, in the northern part of its range (Washington to southern Canada), its preferred host is Douglas fir (Pseudotsuga menziesii).

Edibility
Experienced mushroom hunters regard this mushroom as a good edible species, but caution must be exercised when collecting A. calyptroderma for the table, since it can be confused with other species in the genus Amanita. This genus contains some of the deadliest mushrooms in the world, most notably A. phalloides and A. ocreata.

Similar species
Amanita vernicoccora is a closely related edible species, which fruits in hilly or mountainous areas from late winter to spring. Otherwise similar in appearance, its cap is yellow. A. caesarea is also related and edible.

The deadly poisonous A. phalloides is similar in appearance.

See also
List of Amanita species

References

External links
Amanita calyptroderma at Amanitaceae.org
 Amanita calyptroderma at BayAreaMushrooms.org
 Amanita calyptroderma at Mykoweb
 Amanita calyptroderma at Mushroom Expert

calyptroderma
Edible fungi
Fungi of North America